Vanilla Trainwreck is an indie rock group from Raleigh, North Carolina that was active in the 1990s. They released three albums on Mammoth Records.  The band members are still active in the Raleigh scene today, with singer/guitarist Greg Elkins now producing records and drummer Brian Quast playing in the reunited Polvo.

Discography
 Santaclaustrophobia (1989)
 Sofa Livin' Dreamazine (1991)
 Sounding to Try Like You (1992)
 Mordecai (1994)

Indie rock musical groups from North Carolina
Musical groups from Chapel Hill-Carrboro, North Carolina